Abuja is the Nigeria's Federal Capital Territory, situated in the central region of the country. It is where the Presidential Villa is located.

List of Universities
 University of Abuja
 African University of Science and Technology
 Baze University, Abuja
 National Open University, Abuja
 Nile University of Nigeria, Abuja
 Veritas University, Abuja

List of Colleges
 Federal College of Education, Zuba, Abuja
 Aspire College of Technology

List of Polytechnics 
 Citi Polytechnic, Abuja
  Dorben Polytechnic, Abuja

Schools of Nursing 
 Federal Capital Territory (FCT) School of Nursing, Abuja
 School of Nursing, Abuja University Teaching Hospital (AUTH), Abuja

List of Vocational Institutes
Afrihub ICT Institute
Comprehensive Institute of Management and Technology
Damson Institute of Management and Technology
Flying Dove Institute of Information Technology
Global Institute of Commerce and Technology, Gwarinpa
NAOWA Institute of Management and Technology
National Centre for Women Development, Abuja

Other Tertiary Institutions 
Abuja School of Pension and Retirement
National Institute for Legislative Studies, Maitama
Industrial Training Fund (ITF) Models Skill Training Centre
Agency for Mass Education Training Centre, Asokoro  
Agency for Mass Education Technology Centre, Asokoro 
Armed Forces Electrical and Mechanical Mechatronic School, Abuja 
Nspire Educational Services

See also
 List of Tertiary Institutions in Yobe State
 List of tertiary institutions in Ogun State
 List of tertiary institutions in Ondo State

References

Abuja